Béla Bartók's Violin Concerto No. 1, Sz. 36, BB 48a was written in the years 1907–1908, but only published in 1956, 11 years after the composer's death, as "Violin Concerto No. 1, Op. posth." It was premiered on 30 May 1958 in Basel, Switzerland.

Background

The concerto was dedicated, as was Othmar Schoeck's concerto for the same instrument, to the violinist Stefi Geyer, with whom Bartók was in love.  Geyer could not reciprocate Bartók's feelings and rejected the concerto.  It was revived after both Bartók and Geyer had died. Geyer's copy of the manuscript was bequeathed to Paul Sacher to be performed by him and Hansheinz Schneeberger. The concerto was later championed by David Oistrakh. Acclaimed recordings include Oistrakh with Gennady Rozhdestvensky conducting, as well as versions by Maxim Vengerov and György Pauk.

Structure

The composition strays from the path of the traditional concerto, having two rather than three movements:

Far from being an innovation, the two-movement form is the traditional design of the rhapsody: a slow movement followed by a fast one. Bartók had already used this form in 1904 for his first concertante work, the Rhapsody, Op. 1, for piano and orchestra .

Bartók used the Andante as the first of the Two Portraits, Op. 5, representing Stefi Geyer. It has been speculated that the second movement is a self-portrait of the composer .

The retrospective assignment of "No. 1" to this concerto (and the consequent redesignation of the Violin Concerto Bartók composed in 1936–1939 as "No. 2") has met with some resistance, especially from Hungarian scholars and musicologists, on grounds that the composer had "annulled" this concerto, not only by excluding it from his list of mature works but also by extracting the first movement and reworking it in 1911 as the first of Two Portraits, Op. 5. The objection has also been made that, even though an early String Quartet, composed in Pozsony, and an early Sonata for Violin and Piano have been published, the traditional numberings of the String Quartets and the Violin Sonatas have not been changed .

References

External links 
 

Concertos by Béla Bartók
Bartok 01
1908 compositions
Bartók